Victor Omololu Olunloyo (born 14 April 1935) is a mathematician who became governor of Oyo State in Nigeria in October 1983, holding the office briefly until the military regime of Muhammadu Buhari took power in December 1983. He later became a power in the People's Democratic Party (PDP) in Oyo State.

Early life

Victor Omololu Sowemimo Olunloyo was born in Ibadan on 14 April 1935. His father, Horatio Olunloyo was Christian and his late mother Alhaja Bintu Tejumola Abebi Olunloyo who died October 2013 at 102-year-old was Muslim.  
His father died in December 1948 when Victor Olunloyo was 13 years old. 
Olunloyo gained a Ph.D. from St. Andrews University in 1961. His thesis was on the Numerical Determination of the Solutions of Eigenvalue Problems of the Sturm–Liouville Type. 
He published several other papers on number theory and applied mathematics.

Olunloyo was appointed Commissioner for Economic Development for the Western Region in 1962 at the age of 27, in the cabinet of Dr. Moses Majekodunmi. He was re-appointed when Colonel Adeyinka Adebayo was appointed military governor of Western State. Other positions included Commissioner for Community Development, Education (twice), Special Duties, Local Government and Chieftaincy Affairs which includes crowning of two of Nigeria's monarchs namely the Alaafin of Oyo, Oba Lamidi Adeyemi III and the Soun of Ogbomosho King Oyewunmi. He was appointed chairman of the Western Nigerian Development Corporation.

Governor of Oyo State

In 1983, Olunloyo ran for governor of the old Oyo State on the National Party of Nigeria (NPN) platform, and defeated the incumbent, Bola Ige of the Unity Party of Nigeria (UPN), assuming office in October 1983. His term ended three months later when General Muhammadu Buhari took power and dismissed the elected government on December 31, 1983.

Later career

In November 2002, Olunloyo said he would be a candidate for governor of Oyo State in the April 2003 elections.
However, Rasheed Ladoja was eventually chosen as the PDP candidate.
In 2009, he was chairman of a panel to investigate the collapse of a part of the Pharmacy section of the Ladoke Akintola University of Technology. The panel laid blame on the contractor and on the state government, drawing attack from the Oyo State governor Adebayo Alao-Akala.
He was elected chairman of the PDP Planning and Strategy Committee for Ibadanland to prepare for the 2011 election, and was also made chairman of the PDP Media and Publicity Committee for the state. In 2012, Olunloyo abandoned the PDP political party and joined ACN.

References

1935 births
Living people
Yoruba politicians
Governors of Oyo State
Peoples Democratic Party (Nigeria) politicians
National Party of Nigeria politicians
Politicians from Ibadan
Alumni of the University of St Andrews
20th-century Nigerian mathematicians